Exserohilum heteropogonicola is a species of fungus in the family Pleosporaceae. Found in Uttarakhand, where it grows on the leaves of Heteropogon contortus, it was described as new to science in 1984. It has conidia that are cylindrical to fusoid (spindle-shaped), and often curved.

References

External links

Fungi described in 1984
Pleosporaceae
Fungi of Asia